Brahmapur is a major and one of the oldest railway stations in the Indian state of Odisha. It is administered under Khurda Road railway division of East Coast Railway zone.
It serves Brahmapur Silk city of India, Ganjam district and two other districts of South Odisha and other districts of neighboring Andhra Pradesh. It is one of the  'A' grade (NSG3) railway stations of India. After Berhampur, Paralakhemundi (PLH) is the first Odisha Originated and dedicated Railway station in Odisha. Which was earlier in Ganjam district (present day Gajapati district) of odisha.

History
During the period of 1893 to 1896, ( of East Coast State Railway) this historic Brahmapur station was built and opened to traffic in 1896. Bengal Nagpur Railway's line to  Brahmapur (Berhampur) was opened on 1 January 1899.

Railway reorganization
The Bengal Nagpur Railway was nationalized in 1944.Eastern Railway was formed on 14 April 1952 with the portion of East Indian Railway Company east of Mughalsarai and the Bengal Nagpur Railway. In 1955, South Eastern Railway was carved out of Eastern Railway. It comprised lines mostly operated by BNR earlier. Amongst the new zones started in April 2003 were East Coast Railway  and South East Central Railway. Both these railways were carved out of South Eastern Railway.

Accessibility 
 Distance from City Bus Stand 
 Distance from New Bus Stand(Haldiapadar) 
 Distance from Jamia masjid (Ahlay sunnat wal jamaat) 
 Distance from MKCG Hospital 
 Distance from Berhampur University 
 Distance from Army AD College 
 Distance from Gopalpur Sea Beach 
 Distance from Khwaja street dargah 
 Distance from Sonapur Sea Beach

 Distance from Khallikote University
 Distance from Tampara Lake 
The nearest international airport is Biju Patnaik International Airport (172 km)

Gallery

References

External links
  Trains at Brahmapur
 
 

Railway stations in Ganjam district
Khurda Road railway division
Railway stations in India opened in 1896
Berhampur